Matías Esteban Cenci (born 12 February 1978) is an Argentine former professional footballer who played as a forward.

References

External links
 
 

1978 births
Living people
People from Quilmes
Argentine footballers
Association football forwards
Quilmes Atlético Club footballers
FC St. Pauli players
FC Luzern players
SV Darmstadt 98 players
SV Wehen Wiesbaden players
FSV Frankfurt players
Bundesliga players
2. Bundesliga players
3. Liga players
Argentine expatriate footballers
Argentine expatriate sportspeople in Germany
Expatriate footballers in Germany
Argentine expatriate sportspeople in Switzerland
Expatriate footballers in Switzerland
Sportspeople from Buenos Aires Province